Magic fingers, or variants, may refer to:
 Magic Fingers Vibrating Bed, invented by John Houghtaling
 The Magic Finger, a 1962 fantasy story by Roald Dahl

Music
 Magic Fingers (Balawan album), 2005
 Magic Fingers (Chuck Loeb and Andy LaVerne album), 1989 
"Magic Fingers", a song originally from the 1971 soundtrack album for the film 200 Motels by Frank Zappa
"Magic Fingers", a 1955 single by Eddie Fisher
"Magic Fingers", a song and reprise in the musical Betty Blue Eyes
"Magic Fingers", a jazz instrumental song on the 1992 album UFO Tofu by Béla Fleck and the Flecktones
"Magic Fingers (25¢)", a song on the 1989 album Faultline by Birdsongs of the Mesozoic
Magic Fingers, a record label produced by Shizzi
The Magic Fingers, a backing group associated with Frank Bango
Magic Fingers, a defunct pop band made up of Matt Hollywood, Eric Hedford, and Spike Keating

See also

  or 
  or